Don't Come Home for Christmas is the first album from Jeff Dunham. It was released on November 4, 2008. Two songs were taken from the Jeff Dunham's Very Special Christmas Special, "Jingle Bombs" and "Roadkill Christmas". Both songs were remastered from the album.

Track listing
Note: All songs are written by Brian Haner with exception of those noted.

References

2008 debut albums
2008 Christmas albums
Christmas albums by American artists
Jeff Dunham albums
2000s comedy albums